Ralph Curtis Shalless (28 January 1923 – 27 October 2006) was  a former Australian rules footballer who played with Melbourne and Hawthorn in the Victorian Football League (VFL).

Shalless played for Melbourne reserves from 1940 and finally made his league senior debut in 1943. He missed the next two seasons due to his service with both the Australian Army and then the Royal Australian Air Force during World War II. Shalless was the Melbourne reserves vice-captain in 1946 and made another senior appearance late in the season.

Shalless captain/coached the University side in Mildura in 1947, winning the Mildura League's best and fairest in that year.

In 1948 Shalless returned to the VFL, this time playing with Hawthorn.

Shalless went on to Morwell in 1950 and won the Central Gippsland Football League Reserves best and fairest in 1951, 1952  and 1953!

Notes

External links 

Ralph Shalless Profile at Demonwiki

1923 births
2006 deaths
Australian rules footballers from Victoria (Australia)
Melbourne Football Club players
Hawthorn Football Club players